Malkajgiri Assembly constituency is a constituency of Telangana Legislative Assembly, India. It is one of 14 constituencies in Ranga Reddy district. It is part of Malkajgiri Lok Sabha constituency. It is also one of the 24 constituencies of GHMC.

Mynampally Hanmantha Rao of Telangana Rashtra Samithi is currently representing the constituency.

Neighbourhoods under this Constituency

Members of Legislative Assembly

Election results

Telangana Legislative Assembly election, 2018

Telangana Legislative Assembly election, 2014

Andhra Pradesh Legislative Assembly election, 2009

See also
 Malkajgiri
 List of constituencies of Telangana Legislative Assembly

References

Assembly constituencies of Telangana
Ranga Reddy district